Pethanaickenpalayam (also spelled as  Peddanayakkanpalayam or shortened to P.N. Palayam) is a town panchayat and headquarters of Peddanayakkan Palayam taluk, in Salem district, Tamil Nadu, India.

Geography
Pethanaickenpalayam is located within its namesake taluk, which is in the northeast of Salem district. The Upper Vellar or Vasishta Nadi River flows to the northeast of the town during the wet season. A railway line and National Highway 79 pass through the center of town.

Demographics
In 2011 Pethanaickenpalayam had a population of 17,678 people living in 4,611 households. 8,768 (49.6%) of the inhabitants were male, while 8,910 (50.4%) were female. 1,771 children in the town, about 10% of the population, were at or below the age of 6. 66.2% of the population was literate. Scheduled Castes and Scheduled Tribes accounted for 36.8% and 0.78% of the population, respectively.

References

Cities and towns in Salem district